The 2017–18 Panathinaikos season is the club's 59th consecutive season in Super League Greece. They are also competing in the Greek Cup.

Players

Transfers

In

Summer

Winter

Out

Summer

Winter

Competitions

Super League Greece

League table

Matches

Greek Cup

Group stage

Round of 16

UEFA Europa League

Qualifying phase

Third qualifying round

Play-off round

References

External links 

Panathinaikos F.C. seasons
Panathinaikos